Events in the year 1907 in Bolivia.

Incumbents
President: Ismael Montes

Events

Births

Deaths
March 19 - Mariano Baptista, president of Bolivia (b. 1832)

References

 
1900s in Bolivia